Mount Hicks is a summit in the U.S. state of Nevada.

Mount Hicks was named after E. R. Hicks, a prospector.

References

Mountains of Mineral County, Nevada